Lian Yu (born 1886) was a diplomat, politician, judicial officer and lawyer in the Republic of China. He was an important politician during the Reformed Government of the Republic of China and Wang Jingwei regime (Republic of China-Nanjing). Another art-name was Liqing. He was born in Wuxi, Jiangsu.

Biography
Lian Yu went to Japan where he acquired Bachelor of Laws, Kyoto Imperial University. Later he returned to China, got a position in the Ministry for Foreign Affairs of the Beijing Government. In January 1913 he was appointed Chief of the Zhejiang High Court, but he resigned in November. The following March he was appointed Chief of the Zhili High Court which post he held until September 1920. He was transferred to acting Chief of the Henan High court soon, but resigned next month. Later he was an established lawyer in Tianjin.

In April 1938 Lian Yu was appointed Vice-Minister for Foreign Affairs in the Reformed Government of the Republic of China, but resigned in June. Next February, the Minister for Foreign Affairs Chen Lu was assassinated by secret agents of the Nationalist Government, so Lian served 4 months as acting Minister for Foreign Affairs. In same August he was transferred to the position of acting Minister for Business (Xia Qifeng succeeded him as acting Minister for Foreign Affairs).

In March 1940 the Reorganized National Government of China was established, Lian Yu was appointed a legislator (Member of the Legislative Yuan). In the end of the same year he was appointed the first Ambassador to Manchukuo. In February 1943 he was recalled (Chen Jicheng  succeeded him in this position) and became Ambassador standing at the Ministry. In May 1945 he was appointed as the last Ambassador to Japan.

After the Wang Jingwei regime collapsed, the whereabouts of Lian Yu remained unknown.

Alma mater

Kyoto Imperial University

References

Citations

Sources 

 
 

Politicians from Wuxi
Foreign Ministers of the Republic of China
Chinese people of World War II
Chinese collaborators with Imperial Japan
1886 births
Year of death uncertain
Republic of China politicians from Jiangsu
Ambassadors of China to Japan